Lev Nikolayevich Matveyev (born 12 February 1971) is a former Russian professional footballer.

Club career
He made his professional debut in the Soviet Second League in 1988 for FC Gastello Ufa.

Honours
 Soviet Top League champion: 1991.
 Soviet Cup finalist: 1992.

References

1971 births
People from Ishimbay
Living people
Soviet footballers
Russian footballers
Association football midfielders
Soviet Top League players
Russian Premier League players
Liga Leumit players
FC Neftyanik Ufa players
PFC CSKA Moscow players
FC KAMAZ Naberezhnye Chelny players
FC Amkar Perm players
Maccabi Ironi Ashdod F.C. players
Russian expatriate footballers
Expatriate footballers in Israel
Russian expatriate sportspeople in Israel
FC Zvezda Perm players
Sportspeople from Bashkortostan